Khusheh Darreh (also Romanized as Khūsheh Darreh; also known as Khoosheh Dareh Khor Khoreh and Vasheh Darreh) is a village in Chehel Cheshmeh-ye Gharbi Rural District, Sarshiv District, Saqqez County, Kurdistan Province, Iran. At the 2006 census, its population was 249, in 46 families. The village is populated by Kurds.

References 

Towns and villages in Saqqez County
Kurdish settlements in Kurdistan Province